N-acetylserotonin O-methyltransferase-like protein is an enzyme that in humans is encoded by the ASMTL gene.

References

Further reading

External links